Dichomeris copa, the copa dichomeris moth, is a moth of the family Gelechiidae. It was described by Ronald W. Hodges in 1986. It is found in North America, where it has been recorded from Wyoming east to southern Ontario and Vermont, south to southern Illinois and Maryland.

The wingspan is about 15 mm. The forewings are dark grey with a yellowish-brown basal patch. There are two small pale spots and a larger irregular-shaped spot arranged in a triangle on the median area. The hindwings are whitish with slightly darker shading near the outer margin. Adults are on wing from June to September.

The larvae feed on Solidago species.

Etymology
The species name is derived from Latin copa (meaning dancing girl).

References

copa
Moths described in 1986